Mu'ayyad al-Din Abu Isma'il al-Husayn ibn Ali ibn Muhammad ibn Abd al-Samad al-Du'ali al-Kināni al-Tughra'i ( (1061 – c. 1121) was an Arab poet and alchemist.

Biography
Mu'ayyad al-Din al-Tughra'i was born in Isfahan, Persia, and composed poems in the Arabic language. He was an administrative secretary (therefore the name Tughra'i'''). He ultimately became the second-most-senior official (after the vizier) in the civil administration of the Seljuq Empire.

Al-Tughra'i had been appointed vizir to Emir Ghiyat-ul-Din Mas'ud, and upon the death of the emir a power struggle ensued between Mas'ud's sons. Al-Tughra'i sided with the emir's elder son, but the younger prevailed. In retribution, the younger son accused al-Tughra'i of heresy and had him beheaded.

Writings
Al-Tughra'i was a well-known and prolific writer on astrology and alchemy, and many of his poems (diwan) are preserved today as well. In the field of alchemy, al-Tughra'i is best known for his large compendium titled Mafatih al-rahmah wa-masabih al-hikmah, which incorporated extensive extracts from earlier Arabic alchemical writings, as well as Arabic translations from Zosimos of Panopolis's old alchemy treatises written in Greek, which were until 1995 erroneously attributed to unknown alchemists by mistakes and inconsistencies in the transliteration and transcription  of his name into Arabic.

In 1112 CE, al-Tughra'i also composed Kitab Haqa'iq al-istishhad, a rebuttal of a refutation of the occult in alchemy written by Ibn Sina.

See also
List of Iranian scientists
List of Muslim scientists

References

Sources

Further reading
For his life, see:
 F. C. de Blois, 'al-Tughra'i' in The Encyclopaedia of Islam'', 2nd edition, ed. by H. A. R. Gibb, B. Lewis, Ch. Pellat, C. Bosworth et al., 11 vols. (Leiden: E. J. Brill, 1960–2002), vol. 10, pp. 599–600.

For a list of his alchemical writings, see:
 Manfred Ullmann, Die Natur- und Geheimwissenschaften im Islam, Handbuch der Orientalistik, Abteilung I, Ergänzungsband VI, Abschnitt 2 (Leiden: E. J. Brill, 1972), pp 229–231 and 252–3.
 For details about Zosimos of Panopolis translations, see: 

1061 births
1121 deaths
11th-century Arabs
12th-century Arabs
Arab scientists
Alchemists of the medieval Islamic world
Scientists from Isfahan
Arab chemists